Emanuela Brusati (born 19 April 1973) is an Italian former professional tennis player.

Brusati competed on the professional tour in the 1990s, reaching a top singles ranking of 274 in the world. She made the second round at a WTA Tour tournament in Hong Kong in 1993 and featured in the qualifying draw for the 1994 Wimbledon Championships.

ITF Circuit finals

Singles: 4 (2–2)

Doubles: 12 (6–6)

References

External links
 
 

1973 births
Living people
Italian female tennis players
20th-century Italian women